The West Chichagof-Yakobi Wilderness is a federally designated wilderness.  It encompasses  in Southeastern Alaska, in the United States.  It includes Yakobi Island and the entire western side of Chichagof Island, as well as the many small island systems along their coasts.

The wilderness was created through a citizen's proposal after teachers from the area suggested that it would be a good place to preserve.  The proposal requested that the wilderness run from Lisianski Inlet south to  the north end of Hoonah Sound.  The Wilderness was designated in 1980 by the Alaska National Interest Lands Conservation Act. It is part of Tongass National Forest, which is managed by the United States Forest Service.

References

ANILCA establishments
IUCN Category Ib
Protected areas of Hoonah–Angoon Census Area, Alaska
Protected areas of Sitka, Alaska
Wilderness areas of the Tongass National Forest
1980 establishments in Alaska
Protected areas established in 1980